The Municipality of Destrnik is a municipality in northeastern Slovenia. The seat of the municipality is the settlement of Destrnik. It lies in the Slovene Hills north of Ptuj. The area is part of the traditional region of Styria. It is now included in the Drava Statistical Region.

Settlements
In addition to the municipal seat of Destrnik, the municipality also includes the following settlements:

 Desenci
 Dolič
 Drstelja
 Gomila
 Gomilci
 Janežovci
 Janežovski Vrh
 Jiršovci
 Levanjci
 Ločki Vrh
 Placar
 Strmec pri Destrniku
 Svetinci
 Vintarovci
 Zasadi
 Zgornji Velovlek

References

External links
 
 Municipality of Destrnik on Geopedia
 Destrnik municipal site

Destrnik